Dimapur Kalibari is a Hindu temple dedicated to the Goddess Kali in the town of Dimapur in Nagaland state of India.

History 
The temple was built in 1956. Its 50th anniversary was celebrated in 2006 with the launch of various community services like ambulance service and a library. They organise most Hindu festivals like Durga Puja for the residents of the region. The temple is one of the more famous Hindu temples in North-East India and was built with major contributions from local philanthropists J.C. Das, M.M.Mazumder and S.K Dutta(Kaloo Dutta) who was a president for over 30 years, under whose Presidency the beautiful temple and guest house was built along with other devotees. It is well maintained and a revered place of worship in the region.

Gallery

Geo-co-ordinates
Latitude = 25.9043, Longitude = 93.7253
Lat    = 25 degrees,   54.3 minutes   North
Long = 93 degrees,   43.5 minutes   East

References

External Links 

Hindu temples in Nagaland
Dimapur
Durga temples
Kali temples
20th-century Hindu temples